Thomas Stewart Traill  (29 October 1781 – 30 July 1862) was a British physician, chemist, meteorologist, zoologist and scholar of medical jurisprudence. He was the grandfather of the physicist, meteorologist and geologist Robert Traill Omond FRSE (1858-1914).

Early life
Traill was born at Kirkwall in Orkney, the son of the Rev Thomas Traill (died 1782), the minister in Kirkwall, and his wife Lucia. His father died the year after he was born.

He studied medicine at the University of Edinburgh, gaining his doctorate (MD) in 1802. He was elected a Fellow of the Royal Society of Edinburgh in 1819. His proposers were Robert Jameson, John Murray, Lord Murray, and Thomas Charles Hope. He was Curator of the Society's museum from 1834 to 1856.

He practised medicine for 30 years in Liverpool, and was a founder of the Royal Institution of Liverpool, the Liverpool Mechanics' Institution and the Literary and Philosophical Society of Liverpool. He became acquainted with the Arctic explorer William Scoresby, contributing a list of animals observed in eastern Greenland to Scoresby's Journal of a Voyage to the Northern Whale Fishery (1823). Scoresby named Traill Island in Greenland for him. Mount Traill in Nigeria was named after him by William Balfour Baikie.

In 1812 he first suggested creation of a Royal Society of Liverpool which eventually came to fruition in 1821.

When John James Audubon arrived in Liverpool in July 1826 Traill helped him to find a publisher for his The Birds of America. Audubon named the Traill's flycatcher after him, which at one time referred to a species which included both the willow flycatcher (Empidonax traillii) and the alder flycatcher (Empidonax alnorum).

Always interested in railways, in October 1829 he and his family attended the famous Rainhill trials and saw first hand Stephenson's "Rocket" win the competition. During this trial he, his wife and two daughters were invited as passengers in a rival engine, the "Novelty" built by Braithwaite and Ericsson, one of the runners-up in the trials. This makes them possibly the first passengers on a steam train.

University of Edinburgh and the Encyclopædia Britannica

Traill returned to the University of Edinburgh in 1832 as a professor of medical jurisprudence, and served in this role until death, also serving as President of the Royal College of Physicians in Edinburgh 1852 to 1854. In 1833 he was elected a member of the Aesculapian Club.

In 1847 he replaced Macvey Napier as main Editor of the Encyclopædia Britannica (1852–61) and was creator of its 8th edition: works concluding a year before his death.

He was a keen (but unsuccessful) supporter of women attending the university.

He was President of the Royal Scottish Society of the Arts 1843–44.

In 1840 he was living at 10 Albyn Place in Edinburgh's Moray Estate close to Charlotte Square.

He died at his final home, 29 Rutland Square in Edinburgh's West End on 30 July 1862, and was interred at St Cuthbert's cemetery. The grave contains members of both the Omond family and Traill family and stands against an outer eastern wall of the southern section, under the shadows of Edinburgh Castle.

Family

In July 1811 he was married to Christian Robertson (1780-1842), daughter of Rev Harry Robertson of Kiltearn, Ross-shire and the widow of James Watson of Crantit, an Orkney factor for Lord Dundas. She had married James Watson aged 19 and had five children by him by age 28 when he died, the youngest being born after his father's death. She had a further five children with Traill, two sons and three daughters.

Their daughter Mary Eliza Traill married Robert Omond. Their children included Robert Traill Omond.

Thomas appears to have been cousin or second cousin to Rev Robert Traill (and shows a strong family resemblance).

Publications

Thermometer and Pyrometer (1828)
The Medico-Legal Examination of Dead Bodies (1839) a standard textbook on postmortems co-written with Robert Christison and James Syme.
The Edinburgh Pharmacopoeia (12th Edition - 1841)
Memoir of William Roscoe (1853)

Artistic recognition

His portrait by Alexander Mosses is held by the Scottish National Portrait Gallery in Edinburgh but rarely displayed.

See also
:Category:Taxa named by Thomas Stewart Traill

References

Sources
Audubon to Xánthus, Barbara and Richard Mearns

External links
 

1781 births
1862 deaths
19th-century Scottish people
Academics of the University of Edinburgh
Alumni of the University of Edinburgh
Encyclopædia Britannica
Founders of English schools and colleges
Medical jurisprudence
People from Kirkwall
Scottish book editors
Scottish chemists
Scottish encyclopedists
19th-century Scottish medical doctors
Scottish meteorologists
Scottish zoologists
19th-century philanthropists